The Shire of Kellerberrin is a local government area in the Wheatbelt region of Western Australia, about  west of Merredin and about  east of Perth, the state capital.

History
On 24 July 1908, the Kellerberrin Road District was created, and included large parts of what is now Tammin, Wyalkatchem and Trayning. On 1 July 1961, it became the Shire of Kellerberrin after the Local Government Act 1960 was enacted, which reformed all remaining road districts into shires.

Wards
The Shire has seven councillors and no wards. Prior to the elections in May 2003, there were eight councillors representing three wards - East Ward (2), Kellerberrin Ward (4) and West Ward (2).

Towns and localities
The towns and localities of the Shire of Kellerberrin with population and size figures based on the most recent Australian census:

Population

Notable councillors
 Tom Harrison, Kellerberrin Roads Board member 1911–1915, briefly chairman; later a state MP
 Leslie Diver, Kellerberrin Roads Board member 1933–1946, chairman 1940, 1942–1946; later a state MP

Heritage-listed places

As of 2023, 57 places are heritage-listed in the Shire of Kellerberrin, of which six are on the State Register of Heritage Places.

References

External links

 

Kellerberrin